Ellie Junod (born 15 February 1993) is an Australian professional basketball player who played for the Canberra Capitals in the Women's National Basketball League.

Professional career

WNBL
Junod began her professional career in 2013, with the Canberra Capitals under the leadership of Carrie Graf. She was re-signed twice for the following two seasons.  She has yet to be re-signed for 2016–17.

References

1993 births
Living people
Australian women's basketball players
Sportswomen from New South Wales
Forwards (basketball)